Frederick Leslie Gore (21 January 1914 – 22 January 1991) was an English professional footballer who played in the Football League for Bradford City, Stockport County and Carlisle United as an outside right. He served Leyton Orient as player, manager and trainer for over 20 years and scouted for Charlton Athletic and Millwall.

Career statistics

Honours 
Gillingham

 Southern League: 1948–49

Sources

References

English footballers
Carlisle United F.C. players
Bradford City A.F.C. players
Leyton Orient F.C. players
English Football League players
Association football outside forwards
1914 births
1991 deaths
Footballers from Coventry
Fulham F.C. players
Stockport County F.C. players
Yeovil Town F.C. players
Gillingham F.C. players
Ebbsfleet United F.C. players
Brighton & Hove Albion F.C. wartime guest players
Leyton Orient F.C. managers
Charlton Athletic F.C. non-playing staff
Charlton Athletic F.C. managers
Leyton Orient F.C. non-playing staff
Millwall F.C. non-playing staff
English football managers
English Football League managers